Maj Rorič (born 7 February 2000) is a Slovenian footballer who plays as a midfielder.

Club career

Internazionale
Rorič joined Internazionale youth teams in the summer of 2016. In 2018, he made several appearances for the senior squad in pre-season friendlies, including the 2018 International Champions Cup.

He started playing for their under-19 squad in the 2018–19 season. On 14 February 2019, Rorič was called up to the senior squad's official game for the first time, for the Europa League match against Rapid Wien, but remained on the bench.

Loan to iClinic Sereď
On 27 August 2019, Rorič joined Slovak club iClinic Sereď on a season-long loan.

He made his Slovak Super Liga debut for Sereď on 31 August 2019 in a home fixture against Pohronie. He started the game and played the complete duration of the 3–3 draw.

Rorič scored his premier goal for Sereď in a third round of the 2019–20 Slovak Cup fixture against Petržalka. Together with Tomáš Hučko and Alex Iván he had secured a 3–0 win, advancing Sereď to the round of 16.

References

External links
 

2000 births
Living people
Sportspeople from Kranj
Slovenian footballers
Slovenia youth international footballers
Slovenia under-21 international footballers
Association football midfielders
Inter Milan players
ŠKF Sereď players
NK Celje players
Slovak Super Liga players
Slovenian PrvaLiga players
Slovenian expatriate footballers
Expatriate footballers in Italy
Slovenian expatriate sportspeople in Italy
Expatriate footballers in Slovakia
Slovenian expatriate sportspeople in Slovakia